Malcolm Rathmell (born 18 June 1949), is an English former international motorcycle trials rider. He won the Scottish Six Days Trial in 1973 and 1979, and clinched the FIM Trans America Trials Championship in 1974 (The series was to become FIM Trial World Championship in 1975). Rathmell is a six-time winner of the British Trials Championship between 1971 and 1981 and six-time winner of the Scott Trial between 1971 and 1980. In 2013, Rathmell was named an FIM Legend for his motorcycling achievements.

Biography
Born in Otley, West Yorkshire, England, Rathmell first contested the FIM European Championship in 1970 before finishing runner up to Mick Andrews in the 1971 championship, a year in which he also won the Scott Trial for the first time. Though rarely off the podium in 1972 the championship was a repeat to the previous season, followed by a 3rd-place finish on the factory supported Bultaco for 1973. In 1974 Rathmell almost switched camps from Bultaco to Ossa but found himself facing legal action from Bultaco for breach of contract. Sticking with Bultaco for 1974 worked out for Rathmell as he won the FIM Trans America Trials Championship. He did however switch to Montesa for the 1975 season for the first year of the FIM Trial World Championship and added world round wins in Belgium, Poland and the United States and finish 3rd in the championship. A Runner up position to Bultaco rider Yrjo Vestarinen in 1976 and a 3rd place in 1977 were to be Rathmell's best attempts at recapturing the title on the Montesa. For 1978 a Suzuki ride could only yield a 16th-place finish after which Rathmell rounded out his international career back with Montesa through the 1982 season. Malcolm Rathmell Sports Limited opened in the UK in 1991 as an Aprilia importer and is currently the sole UK distributor for Sherco Motorcycles.

British Trials Championship career

European Trials Championship career

World Trials Championship career

Honors
 Trans America Champion 1974 - (Was called World Champion from the following Year on)
 6 Times British Trials Champion (1971-1981)
 6 Times Scott Trial Winner
 2 Times SSDT winner

Related reading
FIM Trial World Championship
Scott Trial
Scottish Six Days Trial

References

External links
Malcolm Rathmell sports ltd

1949 births
Living people
English motorcycle racers
Motorcycle trials riders
People from Otley
Sportspeople from Yorkshire